The Wu Tao Chishang Lunch Box Cultural History Museum is a museum about lunch boxes in Chishang Township, Taitung County, Taiwan. The museum also serves as a restaurant.

History
The museum was opened in 2002 by Chishang Township Office and Chishang lunchbox vendors.

Architecture
At the front of the building lies two vintage rolling stocks offer the nostalgic environment for a time when travelers would buy a lunch box to take with them on their train journey. On the second floor lies the museum which is devoted to the local rice culture.

Transportation
The museum is accessible within walking distance southeast from Chishang Station of Taiwan Railways.

See also
 List of museums in Taiwan

References

External links

 

2002 establishments in Taiwan
Food museums in Taiwan
History museums in Taiwan
Museums established in 2002
Museums in Taitung County